Graham Saxton Vigrass (born 17 June 1989) is a Canadian former professional volleyball player. He was a member of the Canada national team, a participant at the Olympic Games (Rio 2016, Tokyo 2020), and a bronze medallist at the 2017 World League

Personal life
Vigrass was born in Calgary, Alberta to parents Richard and Sandy Vigrass. His uncle, Don Saxton, played on the Canadian men's national volleyball team at the 1984 Los Angeles Summer Olympics, and his cousin, Ben Saxton, played beach volleyball at the 2016 Rio Summer Olympics. Vigrass started playing volleyball at the age of 13, and played in Calgary for the Canuck Volleyball Club and Western Canada High School during his high school years.

Career

University
Vigrass played U Sports men's volleyball with the University of Calgary Dinos for five seasons from 2007 to 2012. His time there was highlighted by leading the team to win the 2010 CIS Men's Volleyball Championship where he was also named the CIS Championship MVP. During the following season, as defending champions, the Dinos finished with a bronze medal in the 2011 CIS championship and Vigrass was named the CIS Men's volleyball player of the year and the  Canada West representative at the BLG Awards for the top male university athlete in Canada.

Professional
Vigrass spent the 2012-13 season at the Team Canada National Excellence Program (NEP), formerly the Full Time Training Center (FTC), at the Centre Sportif in Gatineau, Canada, before signing in 2013 with Arago de Sète in Sete, France. He helped Étoile Sportive du Sahel win the Tunisian Volleyball Cup in 2015, before joining up with national team coach Glenn Hoag at Arkas Spor for the 2015-16 season. In 2016, Vigrass joined Berlin Volleys, teaming up with national teammate Steven Marshall. In 2018, he joined team ONICO Warszawa and joined national teammate Sharone Vernon-Evans and former national team coach Stephane Antiga. In 2019, he joined Jastrzębski Węgiel. In 2020, he, and national teammate Nicholas Hoag, helped Fenerbahçe_SK become Turkish Men's Volleyball Super Cup champions. In 2021, Vigrass joined Halkbank.

National Team
Vigrass first joined the national team program in 2008 as a member of Canada men's junior national volleyball team. He helped the team win silver at the 2008 Men's Junior NORCECA Volleyball Championship, and qualify for the 2009 FIVB Volleyball Men's U21 World Championship. Vigrass joined the senior national "B" team in 2010, before becoming a full national team member in 2012. He was a member of the squad that finished tied for 7th place at the 2014 FIVB Volleyball Men's World Championship, and helped the team win bronze at the 2015 Pan American Games. He was a member of the squad that won bronze at the 2017 FIVB Volleyball World League. He also helped the national team finish tied for 5th at the 2016 Rio Summer Olympics and finish eighth at the 2020 Tokyo Summer Olympics.  Vigrass retired from the national team in 2022.

Honours

University
 2010  CIS Men's Volleyball Championship, with Calgary Dinos
 2011  CIS Men's Volleyball Championship, with Calgary Dinos

Professional
 2014/2015  Tunisian Volleyball Cup, with Étoile Sportive du Sahel
 2015/2016  Turkish Men's Volleyball League, with Arkas Spor
 2016/2017  Bundesliga, with Berlin Volleys
 2016/2017 4th at the CEV Champions League, with Berlin Volleys
 2017/2018  Bundesliga, with Berlin Volleys
 2018/2019  Polish PlusLiga, with Onico Warszawa
 2020/2021  Turkish Men's Volleyball Super Cup, with Fenerbahçe_SK

National Team
 2008  Junior NORCECA Championship
 2011 4th at the 2011 Summer Universiade
 2014 Tied for 7th place Men's Volleyball World Championship Team Record
 2015  NORCECA Championship Team Record
 2015  Pan American Games Tied a Team Record
 2015 7th place Men's World Cup Tied a Team Record
 2016 Tied for 5th place 2016 Rio Summer Olympics
 2017  FIVB World League Team Record
 2020 Qualified for consecutive back to back Summer Olympics Team Record
 2021 8th place 2020 Tokyo Summer Olympics
 2022 Retired from the national team

Individual awards
 2010 CIS Canadian University Men's Volleyball Championship – MVP
 2010/2011 CIS Canadian University Men's Volleyball – Player of the Year
 2010/2011 BLG Awards (top male university athlete in Canada) -  Western Canada Representative
 2017 FIVB World League – Best Middle Blocker

References

External links
 
 
 PlusLiga player profile

1989 births
Living people
Sportspeople from Calgary
Canadian men's volleyball players
Olympic volleyball players of Canada
Volleyball players at the 2016 Summer Olympics
Volleyball players at the 2020 Summer Olympics
Volleyball players at the 2015 Pan American Games
Pan American Games medalists in volleyball
Pan American Games bronze medalists for Canada
Medalists at the 2015 Pan American Games
Canadian expatriate sportspeople in France
Expatriate volleyball players in France
Expatriate volleyball players in Tunisia
Canadian expatriate sportspeople in Turkey
Expatriate volleyball players in Turkey
Canadian expatriate sportspeople in Germany
Expatriate volleyball players in Germany
Canadian expatriate sportspeople in Poland
Expatriate volleyball players in Poland
Calgary Dinos volleyball players
Arkas Spor volleyball players
Projekt Warsaw players
Jastrzębski Węgiel players
Fenerbahçe volleyballers
Halkbank volleyball players
Middle blockers